Politics of Slovakia takes place in a framework of a parliamentary representative democratic republic, with a multi-party system. Legislative power is vested in the parliament and it can be exercised in some cases also by the government or directly by citizens.

Executive power is exercised by the government led by the Prime Minister. The Judiciary is independent of the executive and the legislature. The President is the head of the state.

History
Before the 1989 revolution, Czechoslovakia was a socialist dictatorship ruled by the Communist Party of Czechoslovakia, technically together with the coalition of the so-called National Front. Before the free democratic elections could take place after the revolution, a transitional government was created. 
1989 President of Czechoslovakia Gustáv Husák sworn in the Government of National Understanding headed by Marián Čalfa and he himself abdicated. It consisted of 10 communists and 9 non-communists and its main goal was to prepare for democratic elections, to establish market economy in the country and to start preparing a new constitution.

On 8–9 June 1990, the Czechoslovak parliamentary election of 1990 took place. Čalfa's second government was disbanded on 27 June 1990, when it was replaced by the Government of National Sacrifice, also headed by Marián Čalfa. On 5–6 June 1992, the last elections in Czechoslovakia, the Czechoslovak parliamentary election of 1992 took place. Čalfa's third government was disbanded on 2 July 1992, when it was replaced by the Caretaker Government of Jan Stráský, headed by Jan Stráský. The caretaker government was disbanded on 31 December 1992 together with the dissolution of the Czech and Slovak Federative Republic.

Due to federalism, immediately after the 1989 revolution, two national governments (one for the Czech Republic, one for Slovakia) were created as well under the federal Czechoslovak government. In Slovakia it was headed by Milan Čič and it was established on 12 December 1989 and disbanded on 26 June 1990. On 8–9 June 1990, the Slovak parliamentary election of 1990 took place together with the federal Czechoslovak elections. Čič's government was followed by the First Government of Vladimír Mečiar (1990-1991), Government of Ján Čarnogurský (1991-1992) and the Second Government of Vladimír Mečiar (1992-1994). On 5–6 June the Slovak parliamentary election of 1992 took place.

Legal system
The Constitution of the Slovak Republic was ratified 1 September 1992 and became effective 1 October 1992 (some parts 1 January 1993). It was amended in September 1998 to allow direct election of the president and again in February 2001 due to EU admission requirements.
The civil law system is based on Austro-Hungarian codes. The legal code was modified to comply with the obligations of Organization on Security and Cooperation in Europe (OSCE) and to expunge the Marxist–Leninist legal theory. Slovakia accepts the compulsory International Court of Justice jurisdiction with reservations.

Executive branch

|President
|Zuzana Čaputová
|Progressive Slovakia
|15 June 2019
|-
|Prime Minister
|Eduard Heger
|Ordinary People
|1 April 2021
|}

The president is the head of state and the formal head of the executive, though with very limited powers. The president is elected by direct, popular vote, under the two round system, for a five-year term. In March 2019, Zuzana Čaputová was elected as the first female President of Slovakia. She was a member of the liberal Progressive Slovakia party, which had no seats in parliament.

Following National Council elections, the leader of the majority party or the leader of the majority coalition is usually appointed prime minister by the president. Cabinet appointed by the president on the recommendation of the prime minister has to receive the majority in the parliament. From July 2006 till July 2010 the coalition consisted of Smer, SNS and HZDS. After the 2010 elections a coalition was formed by the former opposition parties SDKÚ, KDH and Most–Híd and newcomer SaS. From 2012 to 2016, after the premature elections, whole government consisted of members and nominees of the party SMER-SD, which also had majority in the parliament. The 2016 parliamentary election  gave a coalition of parties SMER-SD, SNS and Most-Híd. After the 2020 Slovak parliamentary election, the Ordinary People and Independent Personalities won the election and Igor Matovič became the Prime Minister.  In April 2021, Prime Minister Eduard Heger was sworn in two days after the resignation of his predecessor Igor Matovič. Heger was a close ally of Matovic and deputy head of his Ordinary People party.

Legislative branch
Slovakia's sole constitutional and legislative body is the 150-seat unicameral National Council of the Slovak Republic. Delegates are elected for 4-year terms on the basis of proportional representation.

The National Council considers and approves the Constitution, constitutional statutes and other legal acts. It also approves the state budget. It elects some officials specified by law as well as the candidates for the position of a Justice of the Constitutional Court of the Slovak Republic and the Prosecutor General. Prior to their ratification, the parliament should approve all important international treaties. Moreover, it gives consent for dispatching of military forces outside of Slovakia's territory and for the presence of foreign military forces on the territory of the Slovak Republic. Current Chairman of the National Council is Boris Kollár.

Political parties and elections

Suffrage
18 years of age; universal, equal, and direct suffrage by secret ballot.

Presidential election
The president is elected by direct, popular vote, under the two round system, for a five-year term. Two rounds of the last election were held on March 16 and 30, 2019.

Parliamentary election
Members of the National Council of the Slovak Republic, are elected directly for a 4-year term, under the proportional representation system. Like the Netherlands, the country is a single multi-member constituency. Voters may indicate their preferences within the semi-open list. The election threshold is 5%.

2020 parliamentary election

Other election results
 EU parliament, see 2009 European Parliament election in Slovakia
 Older elections, see Elections in Slovakia

Political parties

The Slovak political scene supports a wide spectrum of political parties including the communists (KSS) and the nationalists (SNS). New parties arise and old parties cease to exist or merge at a frequent rate. Major parties are members of the European political parties. Some parties have regional strongholds, for example SMK is supported mainly by the Hungarian minority living in southern Slovakia. Although the main political cleavage in the 1990s concerned the somewhat authoritarian policy of HZDS, the left-right conflict over economic reforms (principally between Direction - Social Democracy and Slovak Democratic and Christian Union - Democratic Party) has recently become the dominant power in Slovakia's politics.

Judicial branch
The country's highest appellate forum is the Supreme Court (Najvyšší súd), the judges of which are elected by the National Council; below that are regional, district, and military courts. In certain cases the law provides for decisions of tribunals of judges to be attended by lay judges from the citizenry. Slovakia also has the Constitutional Court of Slovakia (Ústavný súd Slovenskej Republiky), which rules on constitutional issues. The 13 members of this court are appointed by the president from a slate of candidates nominated by Parliament.

In 2002 Parliament passed legislation which created a Judicial Council. This 18-member council, composed of judges, law professors, and other legal experts, is now responsible for the nomination of judges. All judges except those of the Constitutional Court are appointed by the president from a list proposed by the Judicial Council. The council also is responsible for appointing Disciplinary Senates in cases of judicial misconduct.

Minority politics

International organization participation
Slovakia is member of ACCT (observer), Australia Group, BIS, BSEC (observer), CE, CEI, CERN, European Audiovisual Observatory, EAPC, EBRD, EIB, EU, FAO, IAEA, IBRD, ICAO, ICC, ICCt, ICRM, IDA, IEA, IFC, IFRCS, ILO, IMF, IMO, Interpol, IOC, IOM, ISO, ITU, ITUC, MIGA, NAM (guest), NATO, NEA, NSG, OAS (observer), OECD, OPCW, OSCE, PCA, UN, UNAMSIL, UNCTAD, UNDOF, UNESCO, UNFICYP, UNIDO, UNTSO, UPU, Visegrád Group, WCO, WEU (associate partner), WFTU, WHO, WIPO, WMO, WToO, WTO, ZC

Political pressure groups and leaders
 Federation of Employers' Associations of the Slovak Republic (AZZZ) (President: Rastislav Machunka)
 Association of Employers of Slovakia (AZS)
 Association of Towns and Villages of Slovakia (ZMOS) (Chairman: Jozef Dvonč) - pressure group consisting of almost all Slovak towns.
 Confederation of Trade Unions of the Slovak Republic (KOZ) (President: Miroslav Gazdík)
 Club 500 (Chairman: Vladimír Soták) - union of Slovak companies employing more than 500 employees.
 Metal Workers Unions (KOVO) (Chairman: Emil Machyna) - merged with OZ METALURG on 1. January 2010.
 Republic Union of Employers (RÚZ) (President: Marián Jusko)
 Slovak Academy of Sciences (SAV) (Chairman: Jaromír Pastorek) - the highest scientific institution in Slovakia.
 Slovak Merchant and Industrial Chamber (SOPK)
 Union of Slovak Pensioners (Chairman: Kamil Vajnorský)
 Slovenská živnostenská komora (Chairman: Vojtech Gottschall) (SŽK) - it was created by Law No. 126/1998 Z. z. from 12. December 1998.
 Slovenský živnostenský zväz (Chairman: Čižmárik Stanislav) (SŽZ)
 General Bishop's Office (Director: Dušan Vagaský)

See also
 List of political parties in Slovakia
 List of Slovak politicians
 Slovak political scandals
 Privatization in Slovakia

References